The 2010 American Solar Challenge (ASC) was an intercollegiate solar car race on June 20–26, 2010. The event was won by the University of Michigan. It was the 10th American national championship solar car race held.

Route
Day 1: Sun, June 20: Start in Broken Arrow, Oklahoma; must reach Neosho, Missouri checkpoint.
Day 2: Mon, June 21: Finish in Topeka, Kansas.
Day 3: Tue, June 22: Start in Topeka, KS; must reach Jefferson City, MO checkpoint.
Day 4: Wed, June 23: Finish in Rolla, MO.
Day 5: Thu, June 24: Start in Rolla, MO; must reach Alton, Illinois checkpoint.
Day 6: Fri, June 25: Finish in Normal, IL.
Day 7: Sat, June 26: Start in Normal, IL; finish in Naperville, IL

Results

Overall

Stage 1

* teams with conditional qualifying status

Stage 2

Stage 3

Stage 4

References

External links
 2010 American Solar Challenge

American Solar Challenge